is a weekday morning news program airing on TV Asahi, a television station in Japan. It was first broadcast on 5 April 1993, and currently airs from 08:00 to 09:55 Mondays to Fridays.

Presenters

Main presenters
Ippei Ogi
Tamao Akae
Ryota Sasaki (News Tempo Up)
Nanako Uemiya

Regular commentators
Shuntaro Torigoe

Network 
TV Asahi and All-Nippon News Network stations
YBS
KNB
FBC
JRT
RKC

External links
Official website

Japanese television news shows
1993 Japanese television series debuts
2011 Japanese television series endings
1990s Japanese television series
2000s Japanese television series
2010s Japanese television series
TV Asahi original programming